Gianluca Costantini (born December 19, 1971) in Ravenna, Italy, is a cartoonist, artist, Comic journalist, and activist.

Biography 
Gianluca Costantini he graduated from the Art Institute Gino Severini of Ravenna in 1991 in Applied Art and the Academy of Fine Arts in Ravenna in Decoration in 1995. He began exhibiting in the historic gallery La Bottega artist engraver Giuseppe Maestri in 1990 in the company of photographer Alex Majoli. His work continues between contamination ranging from mosaic to cyberpunk.

He attends the academy of fine Arts in Ravenna, whose teachers are Fabrizio Passarella, Vittorio D'Augusta, Guido Guidi, Antonio Violetta, Carlo Branzaglia e Claudio Spadoni.

In 1993 he published the first comic strip magazine Schizzo n°5, curated by Massimo Galletti for the Center Comics Andrea Pazienza of Cremona. In 1994 he began his collaboration with the newspaper Il manifesto and the magazine Neural cyberpunk and contemporary art magazine Museo Teo Art Fanzine. In 1994, he knows the artist graffiti Marco Teatro and collaborate with the Happening of comics and illustration in Milan, Bologna, Rome, Turin and Lugano.

Publish for Underground Comics Magazine Interzona, Katzyvari, Alter Vox Magazine, Tribù Magazine d'urto, Fagorgo, Stripburger (Slovenia), Milk and Vodka (Switzerland), laikku (Finland), Kerosene, and Garabattage (Spain).

His political comics are much appreciated in Italy and have gained him respect in cultural circles, has published in 2009 "The Turtle Tamer of Istanbul " written by Elettra Stamboulis. A graphic novel that recounts the life of the intellectual Osman Hamdi Bey.

In 2009 he exhibited at the Lazarides Gallery in London in 2010 at the Salon du dessin contemporain and at the Carousel du Louvre in Paris. In 2014 he exhibited at Dox Centre for the Contemporary Art of Prague and at the Humor Graphic Museum of Diogenes Taborda in Buenos Aires. In Italy he exhibits together with the works of Alighiero Boetti at the Museum of Contemporary Art in Lissone in 2013.

In 2016 Gianluca Costantini was accused of terrorism by the Turkish government for his drawings.

In 2016 he has accompanied the activities of DiEM25 Democracy in Europe Movement 2025, movement founded by Yanis Varoufakis and actively collaborates with Ai Weiwei.

Gianluca Costantini is a teacher at the Academy of Fine Arts in Bologna since 2009, Macerata and Ravenna in 2012.

Publications 
Gianluca Costantini his latest graphic novels include Dinner with Gramsci, Julian Assange Wikileaks hacker ethics. Founder of the magazine inguineMAH!gazine and G.I.U.D.A. Geographical Institute of Unconventional Drawings Arts. Costantini contributes to Courrier International, Internazionale, laLettura (Corriere della Sera), Pagina99, World War 3 Illustrated and Le Monde diplomatique.

Graphic novels

Italy 
 Vorrei incontrarti, Fernandel, 2005
 Ultimo Storia ordinaria di guerra civile (written Saturno Carnoli and Andrea Colombari) Edizioni del Vento, Jesolo Lido 2007
 L'ammaestratore di Istanbul, (written by Elettra Stamboulis) Comma 22, 2008
 Officina del Macello, (written by Elettra Stamboulis) Edizioni del Vento, Jesolo Lido, 2009
 Julian Assange dall'etica hacker a Wikileaks, (written by Dario Morgante) BeccoGiallo, Padova, 2011
 Macchina Suprema, (written Giovanni Barbieri) Giuda Edizioni, Ravenna 2011
 Cena con Gramsci, (written by Elettra Stamboulis) BeccoGiallo, Padova, 2012
 L'ammaestratore di Istanbul, (written by Elettra Stamboulis) Giuda Edizioni, Ravenna, 2013
 Cattive Abitudini, (Written by Emidio Clementi – Massimo Volume), Giuda Edizioni, Ravenna, 2013
 Arrivederci Berlinguer, (written by Elettra Stamboulis) BeccoGiallo, Padova, 2013
 The Turtle Tamer of Istanbul, (written by Elettra Stamboulis) VandA.epublishing, Milan, 2013  – Ebook
 Pertini fra le nuvole, (written by Elettra Stamboulis) BeccoGiallo, Padova, 2014
 Officina del Macello (written by Elettra Stamboulis) Eris Edizioni, Torino, 2014
 Diario segreto di Pasolini, (written by Elettra Stamboulis) BeccoGiallo, Padova, 2015
 Fedele alla linea, (written Gianluca Costantini, Allan Antliff, Laura Silvia Battaglia, Lara Crinò, Carlo Gubitosa, Gabriela Jacomella, Tahar Lamri, Maurizio Maggiani, Igiaba Scego, Elettra Stamboulis, Alberto Tetta) BeccoGiallo, Padova 2017 – Critical texts Luigi Spinola and Daniele Barbieri
Libya, (written by Francesca Mannocchi), Mondadori, Milan, 2019
Patrick Zaki, una storia egiziana, (written by Laura Cappon), Feltrinelli Editore, Milan, 2022

Spain 
 Julian Assange de la ética hacker a WikiLeaks, (written by Dario Morgante) Luces de Gálibo, Barcelona, 2013

France 

 Libye, (written by Francesca Mannocchi), Editions Rackham, Milan, 2020

Political comics 
 Linea Gotica, Associazione Mirada, 2004 – Critical text Sabina Ghinassi
 Diario di un qualunquista, Fernandel, 2006 – Critical text Daniele Brolli
 Sangue in Algeria, Galleria Miomao, 2008 – Critical text Tahar Lamri

Art Books 
 Le cicatrici tra i miei denti, NdA Press, 2016 - Critical texts Lello Voce and Davide Brullo
 Bronson Drawings, Giuda Edizioni, 2013 – Critical texts David Vecchiato, Arturo Compagnoni and Chris Angiolini
 Daily Iraq, Edizioni Libri Aparte, 2009 – Critical text Elettra Stamboulis
 Untitled Drawing Art, Edizioni Libri Aparte, 2009 – Critical text Viola Giacometti
 Porto dei santi, Purple Press, 2009 - Critical text Elettra Stamboulis

Newspaper 
 Il manifesto, n°18, an illustration, Rome, February 18, 1994
 Il manifesto, n°153, an illustration, Rome, June 25, 1994
 Il manifesto, n°271, an illustration, Rome, November 12, 1994
 Corriere della Sera, The little prince and the 8 kings of the world, Rizzoli, Milan, 2017 for Italy Oxfam

Magazines

Brazil 
 Graffiti 76% quadrinosh, Archeangiolie (written by Fabrizio Passarella), Brazil, 2008

England 
 Alan Moore portrait of an extraordinary gentleman, one illustration, Abiogenesis Press, Leigh-on-Sea, 2003
 Ctrl.Alt.Shift Unmasks Corruption, Yes we camp (written by Elettra Stamboulis), curated by Paul Gravett, London, 2010

Finland 
 laikku, n°1, El hombre invisible, Helsinki, 2001

France 
 Le Monde diplomatique, The story of Sheikh Mansour and other myths from Caucaso, Homecooking Books, 2010
 Numéro 0/1 Discours public – Discorso pubblico, Benito Mussolini, edizioni Les Presses Carrées, France, 2014
 Courrier International, n°1280, La storia di Chérif Kouachi, Paris, 2015

Germany 
 Wendepunk.t Zeitschrift für eine Neue Zeit, n°2, Occupy Gezi, Herausgegeben von Hans-Peter Söder, Munich, 2013

Greece 
 Babel, n°235, Thad damn burn the flags (written Allan Antliff), Athens, 2006
 Babel, n°237, Gaz promise (written by Elettra Stamboulis), Athens, 2006
 MOV, n°6, 8 km The history of Zhaer, BabelArt, Athens, 2010

Italy 
 Schizzo, n°5, Ultimo appuntamento (written Nicola Scianamè), Cremona, ArciComics Editions, 1993
 Schizzo, n°6, Linee di confine (written Nicola Scianamè), Cremona, ArciComics Editions, 1994
 Schizzo, n°8, Desiderio (written Nicola Scianamé), Cremona, ArciComics Editions, 1994
 Neural, n°2, an illustration, Sound Machine, 1994
 Neural, n°3, an illustration, Sound Machine, 1994
 Pagina99, marzo, Salah Abdeslam, Rome, News 3.0 Spa, 2016
 Pagina99, maggio, Sharpshooters to Mosul, Rome, News 3.0 Spa, 2016
 Pagina99, giugno, Muhammad Ali and Saddam Hussein, Rome, News 3.0 Spa, 2016
 Pagina99, luglio, Aliaa Elmahdy, Rome, News 3.0 Spa, 2016
 Internazionale luglio, Postcard from Sanhan, Rome, 2016

Portugal 
 Mutate&Survive, Archeangiolie (written by Fabrizio Passarella), Lisboa, 2001
 Courrier Internacional, n°33, Buttes Chaumont A Historia de Chérif Kouachi

Romania 
 Anthology HardcomicSeex, El indio, Bucarest, 2006

Serbia 
 Pancevac-Press, three illustrations, Pancevac Press, Pančevo, 2004
 Kuhinja, n°8, Marzabotto, curated by Aleksandar Zograf, Pančevo, 2005
 Pancevac, n°4270, 4271, 4272, 4273, Pančevo, 2008
 Skulptura? Skulpture?, five illustration, Bijenal Umetnosti, Pančevo, 2014

Slovenia 
 Stripburger, n°25, El hombre invisible, Ed. Strip Core, Ljubljana, 1999
 XXX (Strip) Burger, Befanella, Ed. Strip Core, Ljubljana, 1999

Spain 
 Garabattage, n°8, one illustration, Doble Dosis Ediciones, Barcelona, 2005
 Tmeo, n°40, Scarafaggi (written by Giovanni Barbieri), Edition Exten Kultur Taldea, 1996

Switzerland 
 Milk and Vodka, n°1, five illustrations, Milk and Vodka Editions, Switzerland, 2000

Turkey 
 LeMan, n°1229, Who's Who (written by Elettra Stamboulis), Istanbul, 2015
 LeMan, n°1224, Selahattin Demirtaș (written by Elettra Stamboulis), Istanbul, 2015
 LeMan, n°1211, Dateci LeMan (written by Elettra Stamboulis), Istanbul, 2015
 The Diplomatic Observer, n°91, an illustration, Hattusas Yaymcilik, Ankara, 2015

United States 
 World War 3 Illustrated, n°37, Gaz Promise (written by Elettra Stamboulis), New York, 2006
 Pocketbook Heroes, n°2, El hombre invisible, Bare Bones Studios, Los Angeles, 2011
 World War 3 Illustrated, n°43, Julian Assange (written by Dario Morgante), New York, 2012

Web Publications 
 Drawings the Times, Each week telling the news, Holland, 2016 
 Pagina99, Each week telling Human Rights, Italy, 2015–2016 
 Internazionale, The cold heart of Ravenna, Italy, December 22, 2015 
 Words Without Borders, An Endless Green Line, United States, 2017 
 eastwest, Kim and his ancestors two thousand years of North Korean Dear Leader, Italy, 2017 
 eastwest, The strange holiday of Saad Hariri, Italy, 2017 
 eastwest, Faces and words on the disputed Jerusalem, Italy, 2017 
 eastwest, The man of the stars Taheri awaits the executioner in a prison in Iran, Italy, 2017 
 eastwest, The Trump saga, from grandfather Friedrich to the Donald, Italy, 2018 
 Internazionale, Giulio Regeni e il male del mondo, Italy, 2018 
 CNN, My Freedom Day, United States, 2018

Human Rights 
Gianluca Costantini has worked with the Festival on Human Rights in Tokyo, Milan and Geneva.

He actively collaborates with ActionAid, Amnesty, Cesvi, ARCI and Oxfam organizations.

In 2013 he made drawings for the Occupy Gezi protests in Istanbul.

In 2016 the campaign "Aleppo is Hell – We do not exist" for Amnesty Italy, the draw in journalism portal Drawing The time and The New Arab.

In 2016 he made drawings for the Geneva Summit for Human Rights and Democracy in Geneva

In 2018 he made drawings for:

 FIFDH Festival du Film et Forum International su le Droits Humains in Geneva 
 Human Right Watch Film Festival in London and Toronto
 Festival dei diritti umani in Milan

In 2018 a graphic journalist, Gianluca Costantini, illustrated tributes to the Capital Gazette shooting victims.

In 2019 he received the "Art and Human Rights" Award from Amnesty International

Sport 

In 2018 he made drawings for CNN sport:

 The moments of the 2018 Winter Olympics 
 Illustred PyeongChang Winter Olympics moments (Video) 
 Cristiano Ronaldo: 'PlayStation goal' is talk of the world 
The moments of the 2018 FIFA World Cup
French Open 2018: Sketching at Roland Garros

Curating of cultural events 
Gianluca Costantini founding member of Mirada, an association involved in planning curating of cultural events.
 Joe Sacco Clouds from beyond the borders, MAR Museo d'arte della città, Ravenna, 2002 
 The Veil of Maya Marjane Satrapi, Santa Maria delle Croci, Ravenna, 2003 
 Komikazen International Reality Comics Festival, Ravenna, 2006–2015

Editor and Publisher 
Since 2002 he has headed the Italian comic magazine inguineMAH!gazine and graphic novelists such as Phoebe Gloeckner, Danijel Zezelj, Ramize Erer, Max Andersson, Felipe Abrances, Carlos Latuff, Gord Hill and James Kochalka.
 James Kochalka, Sketchbook Diaries n°1, Fernandel Edition, Italy, 2006
 Phoebe Gloeckner, The Diary of a Teenage Girl,, Fernandel Edition, Italy 2006
 Stefano Tamburini, Snake Agents, Coniglio Edition, Italy, 2006
 James Kochalka, Sketchbook Diaries n°2, Fernandel Edition, Italy, 2007
 Phoebe Gloeckner, A Child's Life and Other Stories, Fernandel Edition, Italy, 2007
 Ramize Erer, Weddings, Fernandel Edition, Italy, 2007
 Danijel Zezelj, Sun City, Comma 22 Edition, Italy, 2007
 Carlos Latuff, #Syria, Giuda Edition, Italy, 2012
 Gord Hill, The 500 Years of Resistance, Italy, 2013

inguineMAH!gazine 
2003–2009 by the magazine inguineMAH!gazine in collaboration with Paper Resistance, Marco Lobietti and Elettra Stamboulis. Editions: Coniglio, Fernandel and Comma 22.

G.I.U.D.A. Geographic Institute of Unconventional Drawings Arts 
2009–2015 by the magazine G.I.U.D.A. Geographical Institute of Unconventional Drawings Arts in collaboration with Elettra Stamboulis and Marco Lobietti. Giuda Editions, Italy

Personal Exhibitions

Personal Exhibitions 
 Gianluca Costantini exhibition at the Scuola Grande di San Rocco in Venice, curated by Global Campus of Human Rights, 2020
Pen Portraits of Imprisoned Journalists, Southampton Central Library, curated by Amnesty International UK, 2020
Gianluca Costantini: Drawing the Reality, Lugano, Studio 1929, Festival of Human Rights in Lugano, 2015
 American Nocturne, Ferrara, Zuni Arte, 2014
 Untitled Drawing Art, Modena, d406 Gallery, 2014
 Stop Bombing Gaza, Buenos Aires, Museos de Humor grafico Diogenes Taborda, 2014
 Whispers and cries in digital democracy, Ferrara, Zuni Arte, 2013
 Gramsci a comic book biography, Perugia, Miomao Art Gallery, 2012
 Abra Kadabra, Ancona, Quattrocentometriquadi Gallery, 2011
 Liturgy of drawn porn, Rome, Mondo Bizzarro Gallery, 2011
 WikiLeaks, Pietrasanta, La Subbia Gallery, 2011
 Vorrei incontrarti (with music of Alan Sorrenti), Piombino, Il Castello, Visionaria Film Festival, 2005

Performance 

 Channeldraw hangs drawings, not people, Festival Transeuropa, Madrid, Matadero, 2017

References

External links 
 
 Gianluca Costantini: The Italian Cartoonist Unmasking the Powerful, by Franco Bastida in PanamPost
 Interview: How A New Generation of Graphic Novels Are Portraying Migration, by Naima Morelli in Global Comment
 Archive political cartoon from 2004 to 2017

1971 births
Living people
Italian cartoonists